

This is a list of the National Register of Historic Places listings in Erie County, Ohio.

This is intended to be a complete list of the properties and districts on the National Register of Historic Places in Erie County, Ohio, United States. Latitude and longitude coordinates are provided for many National Register properties and districts; these locations may be seen together in an online map.

There are 179 properties and districts listed on the National Register in the county, including 2 National Historic Landmarks. The city of Sandusky is the location of 114 of these properties and districts; they are listed separately, while the remaining 65 sites, including both National Historic Landmarks, are listed here.

Current listings

Sandusky

Outside Sandusky

|}

See also

 List of National Historic Landmarks in Ohio
 Listings in neighboring counties: Huron, Lorain, Ottawa, Sandusky
 National Register of Historic Places listings in Ohio

References

 
Erie